The Philippine Christian University (PCU) is a private, Protestant coeducational basic and higher education institution located in Ermita, Manila, Philippines. It was founded in 1946 through the initiatives of the laymen of the Evangelical Association of the Philippines. Originally named as Manila Union University, it was renamed as Philippine Christian College (PCC). In 1976, the PCC acquired university status.

PCU is one of the two major mainline protestant universities at the heart of Metro Manila. The other is Trinity University of Asia (founded under the auspices of the Protestant Episcopal Church). It is also a member institution of Association of Christian Schools, Colleges and Universities (ACSCU).

The university maintains a satellite campus in Iloilo City through a partnership with the St. Roberts International Academy.

Athletics
PCU joined the National Collegiate Athletic Association in 1996. The varsity teams are the PCU Dolphins.

References

External links

Philippine Christian University

Educational institutions established in 1946
Universities and colleges affiliated with the United Methodist Church
Association of Christian Universities and Colleges in Asia
Education in Malate, Manila
Universities and colleges in Manila
Protestant schools in the Philippines
1947 establishments in the Philippines